Havana is a census-designated place (CDP) in Hidalgo County, Texas. The population was 407 at the 2010 United States Census. It is part of the McAllen–Edinburg–Mission Metropolitan Statistical Area.

Geography
Havana is located at  (26.250269, -98.506181).

Demographics
At the 2000 census, there were 452 people, 108 households and 100 families residing in the CDP. The population density was 551.3 per square mile (212.8/km2). There were 125 housing units at an average density of 152.5/sq mi (58.9/km2). The racial makeup of the CDP was 57.30% White, 0.66% Native American, 41.81% from other races, and 0.22% from two or more races. Hispanic or Latino of any race were 98.67% of the population.

There were 108 households, of which 58.3% had children under the age of 18 living with them, 71.3% were married couples living together, 15.7% had a female householder with no husband present, and 7.4% were non-families. 5.6% of all households were made up of individuals, and 3.7% had someone living alone who was 65 years of age or older. The average household size was 4.19 and the average family size was 4.26.

33.6% of the population were under the age of 18, 13.1% from 18 to 24, 29.6% from 25 to 44, 15.3% from 45 to 64, and 8.4% who were 65 years of age or older. The median age was 27 years. For every 100 females, there were 98.2 males. For every 100 females age 18 and over, there were 98.7 males.

The median household income was $21,346 and the median family income was $21,346. Males had a median income of $11,384 compared with $0 for females. The per capita income for the CDP was $5,345. About 39.4% of families and 35.8% of the population were below the poverty line, including 43.3% of those under age 18 and 59.5% of those age 65 or over.

Education
Havana is served by the La Joya Independent School District. The zoned schools for residents are Sam Fordyce Elementary School, Lorenzo de Zavala Middle School, and La Joya High School.

In addition, South Texas Independent School District operates magnet schools that serve the community.

References

Census-designated places in Hidalgo County, Texas
Census-designated places in Texas